Alexander Mackie was a Scottish footballer who played mainly as an inside right and featured for Rangers between 1902 and 1905.

Career
After joining Rangers from Raith Rovers, Mackie began the 1902–03 Scottish Division One campaign as a regular starter, but dropped out of the team in December 1902 after a defeat by Dundee, and only played in two minor Inter-City League fixtures before returning to the line-up for the second replay of the 1903 Scottish Cup Final as a replacement for Johnny Walker, scoring in the victory over Heart of Midlothian.

Back in the side for the following campaign, he played in a second Scottish Cup final in 1904, a defeat to Celtic (he played at centre forward on that occasion with regular marksman R.C. Hamilton missing through injury). Some revenge was gained when Mackie scored in a win over the same opponents in the final of the Glasgow Merchants Charity Cup a month later, only to end up on the losing side in an Old Firm final again five months after that, this time in the Glasgow Cup in the period when the competitive rivalry between the two well-supported Glasgow clubs was intensifying due to the frequency of important matches between them. Mackie kept his place for some months after the arrival of Archie Kyle and Bob McColl added further options for a Rangers forward line that already included the internationals Hamilton, Finlay Speedie and Alec Smith; his final appearance came in February 1905 when he suffered a fractured nose in a match against Port Glasgow Athletic – the injury was predicted to keep him out for a month, but he had no involvement in the 1905 Scottish Cup Final in April or the League Championship play-off in May (both were lost). Following that fairly prominent spell at Ibrox, no further involvement at senior level has been recorded for him (as with a teammate, the defender Alex Fraser).

Mackie took part in the annual Home Scots v Anglo-Scots international trial match in 1904, but is not recorded as having received any other representative honours.

References

Year of birth unknown
19th-century births
Year of death unknown
Scottish footballers
Association football inside forwards
Rangers F.C. players
Scottish Football League players
Raith Rovers F.C. players